Hont County was an administrative county (comitatus) of the Kingdom of Hungary. Most of its territory is now part of Slovakia, while a smaller southern portion is part of Hungary.

Today, in Slovakia Hont is the informal designation of the corresponding territory and an official tourist region.

Geography

 
Hont county shared borders with the counties Bars, Zólyom, Nógrád, Pest-Pilis-Solt-Kiskun and Esztergom. It was situated between Selmecbánya and the Danube river, but the territory around the town of Korpona was added only at the end of the 19th century. The rivers Korpona and Ipoly were the central rivers that flowed through the county. Its area was 2633 km2 around 1910.

Capitals
The capitals of the county were the Hont Castle together with Hídvég (present-day Ipeľské Predmostie), then from the 16th century onwards there was no permanent capital, and finally since early 19th century, the capital was Ipolyság (present-day Šahy).

History
The county arose in the 11th century by separation from the Nógrád county. Around the year 1300, the territory of Kishont was added to the territory of the county, but received a special status.

From 1552 to 1685, most of the county was part of the Ottoman Empire and belonged to the administrative unit called Nógrád sandjak.

Changes to the northern border of the county were performed in 1802 (Kishont became part of the Gömör-Kishont county) and then in the late 19th century (above all Korpona was added to the territory).

In the aftermath of World War I, most of Hont county became part of newly formed Czechoslovakia, as recognized by the concerned states in 1920 by the Treaty of Trianon. A small part of the county situated south-east of the river Ipoly/Ipeľ, stayed in Hungary.

In Czechoslovakia, the county continued to exist as the Hont county (Hontianska župa). In 1923, it became part of the Zvolen county. he Hungarian part of Hont merged with the Hungarian part of Nógrád county to form Nógrád-Hont county in 1923.

In 1928, it became part of the newly created Slovak Land (Slovenská krajina/zem). After the First Vienna Award, between 1938 and 1945 it was united with the redeemed parts of former Bars and Hont counties to form Bars-Hont county with the capital of Léva. The remaining northern part became part of the newly created Hron county (1940–1945) of Slovakia. After World War II, the Trianon borders were restored, Nógrád-Hont County was formed on her remnants in Hungary. In 1949, the Czechoslovak part became part of the newly created Nitra region and Banská Bystrica region of Czechoslovakia, while the Hungarian part was eventually merged into newly formed Pest County in 1950. In 1960, the Czechoslovak became part of the newly created Western Slovak region and Central Slovak region. In 1993, Czechoslovakia was split and in 1996 its territory became part of the newly created Nitra region and Banská Bystrica region of Slovakia.

Demographics

Subdivisions

Until 1802, the county consisted of 3 processuses (in Slovak slúžnovské okresy; a type of districts led by "iudices nobilium") plus the Kishont district. In 1802, when Kishont was removed, the county was divided in four new processus.

In the early 20th century, the subdivisions of Hont county were:

The towns of Vámosmikola and Szob are now in Hungary.

See also
 Alajos Szokolyi

Notes

References

States and territories disestablished in 1920
Counties in the Kingdom of Hungary
Divided regions